Platinum as an investment is often compared in financial history to gold and silver, which were both known to be used as money in ancient civilizations. Experts posit that platinum is about 15–20 times scarcer than gold and approximately 60–100 times scarcer than silver, on the basis of annual mine production. Since 2014, platinum prices have fallen lower than gold. Approximately 75% of global platinum is mined in South Africa.

Overview 
Platinum is relatively scarce even among the precious metals. New mine production totals approximately only  a year. That being so, platinum tends to trade at higher per-unit prices.

Platinum is traded on the New York Mercantile Exchange (NYMEX) and the London Platinum and Palladium Market.  To be saleable on most commodity markets, platinum ingots must be assayed and hallmarked in a manner similar to the way gold and silver are.

The price of platinum changes along with its supply and demand; during periods of sustained economic stability and growth, the price of platinum tends to be as much as twice the price of gold; whereas, during periods of economic uncertainty, the price of platinum tends to decrease because of reduced demand, falling below the price of gold, partly due to increased gold prices. Platinum price peaked at US$2,252 per troy ounce in March 2008 driven on production concerns (brought about partly due to power delivery problems to South African mines). It subsequently fell to US$774 per troy ounce ($25/g) in November 2008. As of 21 November 2022, the platinum spot price in New York was $980 per ounce, compared to $1,742 per ounce for gold and $20.84 per ounce for silver. Platinum is traded in the spot market with the code "XPT". When settled in United States Dollars, the code is "XPTUSD". As the cost of platinum per ounce fell, the cost per ounce for other metals in the platinum group - especially Palladium - rose strongly. As of November 2022, Palladium sits at around US$1900 per ounce, compared to US$980 for platinum.

Investment vehicles

Exchange-traded products

Platinum is traded as an ETF (exchange-traded fund) on the London Stock Exchange under the ticker symbol  and on the New York Stock Exchange as ticker symbols  and 
There are also several ETNs (exchange-traded note) available, some of which are inverse to the price of platinum.

Platinum coins and bars
Platinum bars are available from different foundries in different sizes, like 1 oz, 10 oz, 1 kg. Platinum coins are another way to invest in platinum, although relatively few varieties of platinum coins have been minted, due to its cost and difficulty in working. Since 1997, the United States Mint has been selling American Platinum Eagle coins to investors.

Jewelry as investment
Jewelry has long been a store of wealth in countries such as India, but this method of holding value to pass on to one's heirs has also seen popularity in Europe as well as the United states beginning in the late 2010's.

Accounts
Most Swiss banks offer platinum accounts where platinum can be instantly bought or sold just like any foreign currency.  Unlike physical platinum, the customer does not own the actual metal but rather has a claim against the bank for a certain quantity of metal.

Futures 
Another investment option is to create a futures contract where a predetermined time and place is designated to buy or sell the platinum. Unlike options, the transaction is an obligation, and not a right. The New York Mercantile Exchange (NYMEX) and the Tokyo Commodity Exchange (TOCOM) trades in platinum futures with a minimum contract size of 50 troy ounces and 500 grams respectively.

Others
Other ways of investing in platinum include spread betting or contracts for difference on the price of the metal, owning shares in mining companies with substantial platinum assets or exposure, owning traded options in platinum (only available in the US market).

See also
 Alternative investments
 Gold as an investment
 Inflation hedge
 London Platinum and Palladium Market
 Palladium as an investment
 Silver as an investment
 Diamonds as an investment

References

External links
Information about Platinum as a commodity from New York Mercantile Exchange
London Platinum and Palladium Market

Platinum
Precious metals as investment
Commodities used as an investment
Precious metals